Buckingham Friends School, an independent Quaker school in Lahaska, Pennsylvania was founded in 1794.  The current Quaker Meetinghouse was built in 1768.  An addition was put on in the 1930s, followed by the gymnasium in 1955 and the lower school building. Another addition was built in 2002/2003. In 2015, the Lower School was fully renovated. The school provides for grades K-8. Upper School curriculum includes: Advanced algebra, Chemistry, Astronomy, Geology, American History, Model Congress, English Language Arts, Sustainability Workshop, Art, World Religion, Biology, and Music.

Mission

Buckingham Friends School honors the Light within each person, inspires scholarship and spiritual community, and instills the value of caring for others and our world.

Philosophy

As a Friends school, we believe that each individual contributes in unique and important ways to our community. As educators, we nurture the inherent promise of each student, demonstrate our faith in their abilities, and challenge them to develop the motivation and discipline necessary for personal, social, and academic success.

We teach for life inside and outside the classroom through projects and experiences relevant to the reality of today and the potential of tomorrow. Each student is expected to take responsibility for their work; to strive for high levels of achievement; and to participate fully in a variety of academic, artistic, and athletic pursuits.

We foster a loving and structured environment in which young people look forward to being together, and where accomplishment becomes a shared celebration. We encourage children to maintain a balanced approach to life, to view mistakes as learning experiences, and to address challenges with creativity and confidence.  Our students work hard, respect themselves, recognize each other's humanity, and welcome the diversity of society—building self-awareness and a set of personal values that will guide their contributions to the local and global community for the rest of their lives.

The JEM program

The JEM (Joint Environmental Mission) program started in 1991. It is a foreign exchange program with an environmental theme.  The exchange includes schools in  St. Petersburg, Russia; Belgaum, India; Honolulu, Hawaii; Ngong Hills, Kenya; Melbourne, Australia; Nanchang, China; Montmorillon, France; and Rio Blanco, Amazon Rainforest, Ecuador.  The first school partnership began with School #213 in Saint Petersburg, Russia.  Every 4–5 years a gathering of all JEM partner schools occurs to discuss one of the five environmental themes: Water, Soil, Light, Air, and peace. The last "Earth Summit" was held at Buckingham Friends School in April, 2013. This program has sustained itself over decades connecting with of students and families from around the globe.

General information

Base Religion: Religious Society of Friends (Quaker)
Students: approx. 170
Grades: K-8
Classes Per Grade: 1
Extracurricular Activities: Music, Art, Woodshop, Photography, Acting, and many others.Sports: Basketball, Softball, Field Hockey, Yoga, Soccer, Cross Country, and Lacrosse. 
Head of School: Paul Lindenmaier

Website: http://www.bfs.org

External links

Private elementary schools in Pennsylvania
Schools in Bucks County, Pennsylvania
Private middle schools in Pennsylvania
Quaker schools in Pennsylvania